Labidochromis vellicans is a species of cichlid endemic to Lake Malawi where it is found in areas with rocky substrates in the southern portion of the lake.  This species grows to a length of  SL.  This species can also be found in the aquarium trade.

References

vellicans
Fish of Lake Malawi
Fish of Malawi
Fish described in 1935
Taxa named by Ethelwynn Trewavas
Taxonomy articles created by Polbot